Kashmiri or Koshur (/kəːʃur/) is an Indo-Aryan language spoken by around 7 million Kashmiris of the Kashmir region, primarily in the Indian union territory of Jammu and Kashmir.

In 2020, the Parliament of India passed a bill to make Kashmiri an official language of Jammu and Kashmir along with Dogri, Hindi, Urdu and English. Kashmiri is also among the 22 scheduled languages of India.

Kashmiri has split ergativity and the unusual verb-second word order.

Geographic distribution and status 
There are about 6.8 million speakers of Kashmiri and related dialects in Jammu and Kashmir and amongst the Kashmiri diaspora in other states of India. Most Kashmiri speakers are located in the Kashmir Valley and other areas of Jammu and Kashmir. In the Kashmir valley, they form a majority.

Kashmiri is spoken by roughly five percent of Azad Kashmir's population. According to the 1998 Pakistan Census, there were 132,450 Kashmiri speakers in Azad Kashmir. Native speakers of the language were dispersed in "pockets" throughout Azad Kashmir, particularly in the districts of Muzaffarabad (15%), Neelam (20%) and Hattian (15%), with very small minorities in Haveli (5%) and Bagh (2%). The Kashmiri spoken in Muzaffarabad is distinct from, although still intelligible with, the Kashmiri of the Neelam Valley to the north. In Neelam Valley, Kashmiri is the second most widely spoken language and the majority language in at least a dozen or so villages, where in about half of these, it is the sole mother tongue.  The Kashmiri dialect of Neelum is closer to the variety spoken in northern Kashmir Valley, particularly Kupwara. At the 2017 Census of Pakistan, as many as 350,000 people declared their first language to be Kashmiri.

A process of language shift is observable among Kashmiri-speakers in Azad Kashmir according to linguist Tariq Rahman, as they gradually adopt local dialects such as Pahari-Pothwari, Hindko or move towards the lingua franca Urdu. This has resulted in these languages gaining ground at the expense of Kashmiri. There have been calls for the promotion of Kashmiri at an official level; in 1983, a Kashmiri Language Committee was set up by the government to patronise Kashmiri and impart it in school-level education. However, the limited attempts at introducing the language have not been successful, and it is Urdu, rather than Kashmiri, that Kashmiri Muslims have seen as their identity symbol. Rahman notes that efforts to organise a Kashmiri language movement have been challenged by the scattered nature of the Kashmiri-speaking community in Azad Kashmir.

The Kashmiri language is one of the 22 scheduled languages of India. It was a part of the eighth Schedule in the former constitution of the Jammu and Kashmir. Along with other regional languages mentioned in the Sixth Schedule, as well as Hindi and Urdu, the Kashmiri language was to be developed in the state.

Persian began to be used as the court language in Kashmir during the 14th centuries, under the influence of Islam. It was replaced by Urdu in 1889 during the Dogra rule. In 2020, Kashmiri became an official language in the Union Territory of Jammu and Kashmir for the first time.

Kashmiri is closely related to Poguli and Kishtwari, which are spoken in the mountains to the south of the Kashmir Valley and have sometimes been counted as dialects of Kashmiri.

Phonology

Kashmiri has the following phonemes.

Vowels
The oral vowels are as follows: 

{| class="wikitable" style="text-align: center;"
|-
!  
! Front
! Central
! Back
|-
! High
|  
|  
|  
|-
! Mid
|   ||  
|  
|-
! Low
|
|   ||  
|}

Nasalization is phonemic. All sixteen oral vowels have nasal counterparts.

Consonants

Palatalization is phonemic. All consonants apart from those in the post-alveolar/palatal column have palatalized counterparts.

Archaisms

Kashmiri, as also the other Dardic languages, shows important divergences from the Indo-Aryan mainstream. One is the partial maintenance of the three sibilant consonants s ṣ ś of the Old Indo-Aryan period. For another example, the prefixing form of the number 'two', which is found in Sanskrit as dvi-, has developed into ba-/bi- in most other Indo-Aryan languages, but du- in Kashmiri (preserving the original dental stop d). Seventy-two is dusatath in Kashmiri, bahattar in Hindi-Urdu and Punjabi, and dvisaptati in Sanskrit.

Certain features in Kashmiri even appear to stem from Indo-Aryan even predating the Vedic period. For instance, there was an /s/ > /h/ consonant shift in some words that had already occurred with Vedic Sanskrit (This tendency was complete in the Iranian branch of Indo-Iranian), yet is lacking in Kashmiri equivalents. The word rahit in Vedic Sanskrit and modern Hindi-Urdu (meaning 'excluding' or 'without') corresponds to rost in Kashmiri. Similarly, sahit (meaning 'including' or 'with') corresponds to sost in Kashmiri.

Writing system

There are three orthographical systems used to write the Kashmiri language: the Perso-Arabic script, the Devanagari script and the Sharada script. The Roman script is also sometimes informally used to write Kashmiri, especially online.

The Kashmiri language was traditionally written in the Sharada script after the 8th Century A.D. The script grew increasingly unsuitable for writing Kashmiri because it couldn't adequately represent Kashmiri peculiar sounds by the usage of its vowel signs. Therefore, it is not in common use today and is restricted to religious ceremonies of the Kashmiri Pandits.

Today it is written in Perso-Arabic and Devanagari scripts (with some modifications). Among languages written in the Perso-Arabic script, Kashmiri is one of the scripts that regularly indicates all vowel sounds.

The Perso-Arabic script is recognised as the official script of Kashmiri language by the Jammu and Kashmir government and the Jammu and Kashmir Academy of Art, Culture and Languages.

Despite, Kashmiri Perso-Arabic script cutting across religious boundaries and being used by both the Kashmiri Hindus and the Kashmiri Muslims, some attempts have been made to give a religious outlook regarding the script and make Kashmiri Perso-Arabic script to be associated with Kashmiri Muslims, while the Kashmiri Devanagari script to be associated with some sections of Kashmiri Hindu community.

Perso-Arabic script

Consonants

Vowels

Devanagari

Consonants

Vowels
There have been a few versions of the devanagari script for Kashmiri.
The 2002 version of the proposal is shown below. This version has readers and more content available on the Internet, even though this is an older proposal. 
This version makes use of the vowels ॲ/ऑ and vowel signs
कॅ/कॉ for the schwa-like vowel  and elongated schwa-like vowel  that also exist in other Devanagari-based scripts such as Marathi and Hindi but are used for the sound of other vowels.

Tabulated below is the latest (2009) version of the proposal to spell the Kashmiri vowels with Devanagari. 
The primary change in this version is the changed stand alone characters ॳ / ॴ and vowel signs  /  for the schwa-like vowel  & elongated schwa-like vowel  and a new stand alone vowel  and vowel sign  for the open-mid back rounded vowel  which can be used instead of the consonant व standing-in for this vowel.

Sharada script

Consonants

Vowels

Vowel mark

Grammar
Kashmiri is a fusional language with verb-second (V2) word order. Several of Kashmiri's grammatical features distinguish it from other Indo-Aryan languages.

Nouns
Kashmiri nouns are inflected according to gender, number and case. There are no articles, nor is there any grammatical distinction for definiteness, although there is some optional adverbial marking for indefinite or "generic" noun qualities.

Gender
The Kashmiri gender system is divided into masculine and feminine. Feminine forms are typically generated by the addition of a suffix (or in most cases, a morphophonemic change, or both) to a masculine noun. A relatively small group of feminine nouns have unique suppletion forms that are totally different from the corresponding masculine forms. The following table illustrates the range of possible gender forms:	

{| class="wikitable"
|-
!Process||Masculine||Feminine||Meaning
|-
|-en’ suffix||dukāndār||dukāndāren’||shopkeeper
|-
|-bāy suffix||māstar||māstarbāy||teacher
|-
|-in’ + vowel change||khar||khərin’||donkey
|-
|-ɨr + vowel change||phot||phɔtɨr||basket
|-
|Adding of affix
|

|

|dog/bitch
|-
|vowel change||

|

|rat
|-
|consonant change||

|

|dry
|-
|vowel/consonant change||

|

|hot
|-
|suppletive form||

|

|man/woman
|-
|masculine only||

|---||crow
|-
|feminine only||---||

|housefly
|}

Some nouns borrowed from other languages, such as Persian, Arabic, Sanskrit, Urdu or English, follow a slightly different gender system. Notably, many words borrowed from Urdu have different genders in Kashmiri.

Case
There are five cases in Kashmiri: nominative, dative, ergative, ablative and vocative. Case is expressed via suffixation of the noun.

Kashmiri utilizes an ergative-absolutive case structure when the verb is in simple past tense. Thus, in these sentences, the subject of a transitive verb is marked in the ergative case and the object in nominative, which is identical to how the subject of an intransitive verb is marked. However, in sentences constructed in any other tense, or in past tense sentences with intransitive verbs, a nominative-dative paradigm is adopted, with objects (whether direct or indirect) generally marked in dative case.

Other case distinctions, such as locative, instrumental, genitive, comitative and allative, are marked by postpositions rather than suffixation.

Noun morphology
The following table illustrates Kashmiri noun declension according to gender, number and case.

{| class="wikitable"
|-
! rowspan="2" |
! colspan="2" | Masculine
! colspan="2" | Feminine
|-
! singular || plural
! singular || plural
|-
!Nom.
| -Ø || -Ø || -Ø || -Ø
|-
!Erg.
| -
| -
| -
| -
|-
!Dat.
| - or - or 
| -
| -
| -
|-
!Abl.
| - or - or 
| -
| -
| -
|-
!Voc.
| -
| -
| -
| -
|}

Verbs
Kashmiri verbs are declined according to tense and person, and to a lesser extent, gender. Tense, along with certain distinctions of aspect, is formed by the addition of suffixes to the verb stem (minus the infinitive ending - /un/), and in many cases by the addition of various modal auxiliaries. Postpositions fulfill numerous adverbial and semantic roles.

Tense
Present tense in Kashmiri is an auxiliary construction formed by a combination of the copula and the imperfective suffix -/aːn/ added to the verb stem. The various copula forms agree with their subject according to gender and number, and are provided below with the verb /jun/ (to come):	

{| class="wikitable"
|+ Present 
!
!Masculine
!Feminine
|-
!1st Person Sing.
|
|
|-
!2nd Person Sing.
|
|
|-
!3rd Person Sing.
|
|
|-
!1st Person Pl.
|
|
|-
!2nd Person Pl.
|
|
|-
!3rd Person Pl.
|
|
|}

Past tense in Kashmiri is significantly more complex than the other tenses, and is subdivided into three past tense distinctions. The simple (sometimes called proximate) past refers to completed past actions. Remote past refers to actions that lack this in-built perfective aspect. Indefinite past refers to actions performed a long time ago, and is often used in historical narrative or storytelling contexts.

As described above, Kashmiri is a split-ergative language; in all three of these past tense forms, the subjects of transitive verbs are marked in the ergative case and direct objects in the nominative. Intransitive subjects are marked in the nominative. Nominative arguments, whether subjects or objects, dictate gender, number and person marking on the verb.

Verbs of the simple past tense are formed via the addition of a suffix to the verb stem, which usually undergoes certain uniform morphophonemic changes. First and third person verbs of this type do not take suffixes and agree with the nominative object in gender and number, but there are second person verb endings. The entire simple past tense paradigm of transitive verbs is illustrated below using the verb /parun/ ("to read"):

{| class="wikitable"
|+ Simple Past (Transitive)
! rowspan="2" colspan="2" |
! colspan="2" | Masculine
! colspan="2" | Feminine
|-
! singular || plural
! singular || plural
|-
! colspan="2" | 1st Person
|
|
|
|
|-
! rowspan="2" | 2nd Person
! Non-honorific
|
|
|
|
|-
! Honorific
|
|
|
|
|-
! colspan="2" | 3rd Person
|
|
|
|
|}

A group of irregular intransitive verbs (special intransitives), take a different set of endings in addition to the morphophonemic changes that affect most past tense verbs.

{| class="wikitable"
|+ Simple Past (Special Intransitive)
! rowspan="2" |
! colspan="2" | Masculine
! colspan="2" | Feminine
|-
! singular || plural
! singular || plural
|-
! 1st Person
| -
| -
| -
| -
|-
! 2nd Person
| -
| -
| -
| -
|-
! 3rd Person
| -Ø
| -Ø
| -
| -
|}

Intransitive verbs in the simple past are conjugated the same as intransitives in the indefinite past tense form.

{| class="wikitable"
|+ Simple Past (Intransitive)
! rowspan="2" |
! colspan="2" | Masculine
! colspan="2" | Feminine
|-
! singular || plural
! singular || plural
|-
! 1st Person
| -
| -
| -
| -
|-
! 2nd Person
| -
| -
| -
| -
|-	
! 3rd Person
| -
| -
| -
| -
|}

In contrast to the simple past, verb stems are unchanged in the indefinite and remote past, although the addition of the tense suffixes does cause some morphophonetic change. Transitive verbs are declined according to the following paradigm:

{| class="wikitable"
|+ Indefinite Past (Transitive)
! rowspan="2" |
! colspan="2" | Masculine
! colspan="2" | Feminine
|-
! singular || plural
! singular || plural
|-
! 1st/3rd Person
| -
| -
| -
| -
|-
! 2nd Person
| -
| -
| -
| -
|}

{| class="wikitable"
|+ Remote Past (Transitive)
! rowspan="2" |
! colspan="2" | Masculine
! colspan="2" | Feminine
|-
! singular || plural
! singular || plural
|-
! 1st/3rd Person
| -
| -
| -
| -
|-
! 2nd Person
| -
| -
| -
| -
|}

As in the simple past, "special intransitive" verbs take a different set of endings in the indefinite and remote past:

{| class="wikitable"
|+ Indefinite Past (Special Intransitive)
! rowspan="2" |
! colspan="2" | Masculine
! colspan="2" | Feminine
|-
! singular || plural
! singular || plural
|-
! 1st Person
| -
| -
| -
| -
|-
! 2nd Person
| -
| -
| -
| -
|-	
! 3rd Person
| -
| -
| -
| -
|}

{| class="wikitable"
|+ Remote Past (Special Intransitive)
! rowspan="2" |
! colspan="2" | Masculine
! colspan="2" | Feminine
|-
! singular || plural
! singular || plural
|-
! 1st Perso
| -
| -
| -
| -
|-
! 2nd Person
| -
| -
| -
| -
|-	
! 3rd Person
| -
| -
| -
| -
|}

Regular intransitive verbs also take a different set of endings in the indefinite and remote past, subject to some morphophonetic variation:

{| class="wikitable"
|+ Indefinite Past (Intransitive)
! rowspan="2" |
! colspan="2" | Masculine
! colspan="2" | Feminine
|-
! singular || plural
! singular || plural
|-
!1st Person
| -
| -
| -
| -
|-
!2nd Person
| -
| -
| -
| -
|-	
!3rd Person
| -
| -
| -
| -
|}

{| class="wikitable"
|+ Remote Past (Intransitive) 
! rowspan="2" |
! colspan="2" | Masculine
! colspan="2" | Feminine
|-
! singular || plural
! singular || plural
|-
! 1st Person
| -
| -
| -
| -
|-
! 2nd Person
| -
| -
| -
| -
|-	
! 3rd Person
| -
| -
| -
| -
|}

Future tense intransitive verbs are formed by the addition of suffixes to the verb stem:

{| class="wikitable"
|+ Future (Intransitive)
! ||Singular||Plural
|-
! 1st Person
| -
| -
|-
! 2nd Person
| -
| -
|-
! 3rd Person
| -
| -
|}

The future tense of transitive verbs, however, is formed by adding suffixes that agree with both the subject and direct object according to number, in a complex fashion:

{| class="wikitable"
|+ Future (Transitive) 
! ||Singular Object||Plural Object
|-
! 1st Person Sing.
| -
| -
|-
! 1st Person Pl.
| -
| -
|-
! 2nd Person Sing.
| -
| -
|-
! 2nd Person Pl.
| -
| -
|-
! 3rd Person Sing.
| -
| -
|-
! 3rd Person Pl.
| -
| -
|}

Aspect
There are two main aspectual distinctions in Kashmiri, perfective and imperfective. Both employ a participle formed by the addition of a suffix to the verb stem, as well as the fully conjugated auxiliary /aːsun/ ("to be")—which agrees according to gender, number and person with the object (for transitive verbs) or the subject (for intransitive verbs).

Like the auxiliary, the participle suffix used with the perfective aspect (expressing completed or concluded action) agrees in gender and number with the object (for transitive verbs) or subject (for intransitives) as illustrated below:

{| class="wikitable"
|-
! rowspan="2" |
! colspan="2" | Masculine
! colspan="2" | Feminine
|-
! singular || plural
! singular || plural
|-
|
| -
| -
| -
| -
|}

The imperfective (expressing habitual or progressive action) is simpler, taking the participle suffix -/aːn/ in all forms, with only the auxiliary showing agreement. A type of iterative aspect can be expressed by reduplicating the imperfective participle.

Pronouns
Pronouns are declined according to person, gender, number and case, although only third person pronouns are overtly gendered. Also in third person, a distinction is made between three degrees of proximity, called proximate, remote I and remote II.

{| class="wikitable"
|+ Nominative 
! rowspan="2" colspan="2" |
! colspan="2" | Masculine
! colspan="2" | Feminine
|-
! singular || plural
! singular || plural
|-
! colspan="2" | 1st Person
|
|
|
|
|-
! colspan="2" | 2nd Person
|
|
|-
! rowspan="3" | 3rd Person
! proximate
|
|
|
|
|-
! remote I
|
|
|
|
|-
! remote II
|
|
|/sɔ/
|
|}

{| class="wikitable"
|+ Ergative
! rowspan="2" colspan="2" |
! colspan="2" | Masculine
! colspan="2" | Feminine
|-
! singular || plural
! singular || plural
|-
! colspan="2" | 1st Person
|
|
|
|
|-
! colspan="2" | 2nd Person
|
|
|
|
|-
! rowspan="3" | 3rd Person
! proximate
|
|
|
|
|-
! remote I
|
|
|
|
|-
! remote II
|
|
|
|
|}

{| class="wikitable"
|+ Dative
! rowspan="2" colspan="2" |
! colspan="2" | Masculine
! colspan="2" | Feminine
|-
! singular || plural
! singular || plural
|-
! colspan="2" | 1st Person
|
|
|
|
|-
! colspan="2" | 2nd Person
|
|
|
|
|-
! rowspan="3" | 3rd Person
! proximate
|
|
|
|
|-
! remote I
|
|
|
|
|-
! remote II
|
|
|
|
|}

{| class="wikitable"
|+ Ablative
! rowspan="2" colspan="2" |
! colspan="2" | Masculine
! colspan="2" | Feminine
|-
! singular || plural
! singular || plural
|-
! colspan="2" | 1st Person
|
|
|
|
|-
! colspan="2" | 2nd Person
|
|
|
|
|-
! rowspan="3" | 3rd Person
! proximate
|
|
|
|
|-
! remote I
|
|
|
|
|-
! remote II
|
|
|
|
|}

There is also a dedicated genitive pronoun set, in contrast to the way that the genitive is constructed adverbially elsewhere. As with future tense, these forms agree with both the subject and direct object in person and number.

{| class="wikitable"
|-
! rowspan="2" |
! colspan="2" | Masculine
! colspan="2" | Feminine
|-
! singular || plural
! singular || plural
|-
|1st Sing.|| 

| 

|

| 

|-
|1st Pl.|| 

| 

| 

| 

|-
|2nd Sing.|| 

|

|

| 

|-
|2nd Pl.||

|

|

|

|-
|3rd Sing. Prox.||

|

|

|

|-
|3rd Pl. Prox.|| 

|

|

|

|-
|3rd Sing. R I||

|

|

|

|-
|3rd Pl. R I||

|

|

|

|-
|3rd Sing. R II||

| 

| 

|

|-
|3rd Pl. R II|| 

|

|

|

|-
|}

Adjectives
There are two kinds of adjectives in Kashmiri, those that agree with their referent noun (according to case, gender and number) and those that are not declined at all. Most adjectives are declined, and generally take the same endings and gender-specific stem changes as nouns. The declinable adjective endings are provided in the table below, using the adjective /wɔzul/ ("red"):

{| class="wikitable"
|-
! rowspan="2" |
! colspan="2" | Masculine
! colspan="2" | Feminine
|-
! singular || plural
! singular || plural
|-
!Nom.
|
|
|
|
|-
!Erg.
|
|
|
|
|-
!Dat.
|
|
|
|
|-
!Abl.
|
|
|
|
|}

Among those adjectives not declined are adjectives that end in -lad or -a, adjectives borrowed from other languages, and a few isolated irregulars.

The comparative and superlative forms of adjectives are formed with the words tsor ("more") and sitha ("most"), respectively.

Numerals

Within the Kashmir language, numerals are separated into cardinal numbers and ordinal numbers. These numeral forms, as well as their aggregative (both, all the five, etc.), multiplicative (two times, four times, etc.), and emphatic forms (only one, only three, etc.) are provided by the table below.

{| class="wikitable"
|-
| ||Cardinal||Ordinal||Aggregative||Multiplicative||Emphatic
|-
|Suffix|| ||- for masculine
- for feminine
|-[waj]||- or - for masculine
- for feminine
| -[j]
|-
|0.
|

|
|
|
|
|-
|1.||

| or 
 or 
| ||  or 
 or 
|

|-
|2.||

| or 
 or 
|

| or 
 or 
|

|-
|3.||

| or 
 or  
|

| or 
 or 
|

|-
|4.||

| or 
 or 
|

| or 
 or 
|

|-
|5.|| or 
 or 
| or 
 or 
|

| or 
 or 
|

|-
|6.
|

| or 
 or 
|

| or 
 or 
|

|-
|7.
|

| or 
 or 
|

| or 
 or 
|

|-
|8.
|

| or 
 or 

 or 

 or 
|

| or 
 or 
|

|-
|9.
|

| or 
 or 
|

| or 
 or 
|

|-
|-
|10.
| or 
 or 
| or 
 or 
|

| or 
 or 
|

|-
|11.
| or 
 or 
| or 

 or 
|
|
|
|-
|12.
| or 
 or 
| or 

 or 
|
|
|
|-
|13.
|

| or 

 or 
|
|
|
|-
|14.
|

| or 

 or 
|
|
|
|-
|15.
|

| or 

 or 
|
|
|
|-
|16.
|

| or 

 or 
|
|
|
|-
|17.
|

| or 

 or 
|
|
|
|-
|18.
|

| or 

 or 
|
|
|
|-
|19.
|

| or 

 or 
|
|
|
|-
|20.
|

| or 

 or 
|
|
|
|-
|21.
|

| or 

 or 
|
|
|
|-
|22.
|

| or 

 or 
|
|
|
|-
|23.
|

| or 

 or 
|
|
|
|-
|24.
|

| or 

 or 
|
|
|
|-
|25.
|

| or 

 or 
|
|
|
|-
|26.
|

| or 

 or 
|
|
|
|-
|27.
|

| or 

 or 
|
|
|
|-
|28.
|

| or 

 or 
|
|
|
|-
|29.
|

| or 

 or 
|
|
|
|-
|30.
|

| or 

 or 
|
|
|
|-
|31.
|

| or 

 or 
|
|
|
|-
|32.
|

| or 

 or 
|
|
|
|-
|33.
|

| or 

 or 
|
|
|
|-
|34.
|

| or 

 or 
|
|
|
|-
|35.
| or 
 or  
| or 

 or 

 or 

 or 
|
|
|
|-
|36.
|

| or 

 or 
|
|
|
|-
|37.
|

| or 

 or 
|
|
|
|-
|38.
|

| or 

 or 
|
|
|
|-
|39.
| or 
 or 
| or 

 or 
|
|
|
|-
|40.
| or 
 or 
| or 

 or 
|
|
|
|-
|41.
| or 
 or  
| or 

 or 
|
|
|
|-
|42.
| or 
 or  
| or 

 or 
|
|
|
|-
|43.
| or 
 or  
| or 

 or 
|
|
|
|-
|44.
| or 
 or  
| or 

 or 
|
|
|
|-
|45.
| or 

 or 

 or 

 or 
|
|
|
|-
|46.
| or 
 or 
| or 

 or 
|
|
|
|-
|47.
| or 
 or 
| or 

 or 
|
|
|
|-
|48.
| or 
 or 
| or 

 or 
|
|
|
|-
|49.
|

| or 

 or 
|
|
|
|-
|50.
|

| or 

 or 
|
|
|
|-
|51.
|

| or 

 or 
|
|
|
|-
|52.
|

| or 

 or 
|
|
|
|-
|53.
| or 
 or 
| or 

 or 

 or 

 or 
|
|
|
|-
|54.
|

| or 

 or 
|
|
|
|-
|55.
| or 
 or 
| or 

 or 

 or 

 or 
|
|
|
|-
|56.
|

| or 

 or 
|
|
|
|-
|57.
|

| or 

 or 
|
|
|
|-
|58.
|

| or 

 or 
|
|
|
|-
|59.
|

| or 

 or 
|
|
|
|-
|60.
|

| or 

 or 
|
|
|
|-
|61.
|

| or 

 or 
|
|
|
|-
|62.
|

| or 

 or 
|
|
|
|-
|63.
| or 
 or 
| or 

 or 

 or 

 or 
|
|
|
|-
|64.
|

| or 

 or 
|
|
|
|-
|65.
| or 
 or 
| or 

 or 

 or 

 or 
|
|
|
|-
|66.
|

| or 

 or 
|
|
|
|-
|67.
|

| or 

 or 
|
|
|
|-
|68.
|

| or 

 or 
|
|
|
|-
|69.
|

| or 

 or 
|
|
|
|-
|70.
|

| or 

 or 
|
|
|
|-
|71.
|

| or 

 or 
|
|
|
|-
|72.
|

| or 

 or 
|
|
|
|-
|73.
| or 
 or 
| or 

 or 

 or 

 or 
|
|
|
|-
|74.
|

| or 

 or 
|
|
|
|-
|75.
| or 
 or 
| or 

 or 

 or 

 or 
|
|
|
|-
|76.
|

| or 

 or 
|
|
|
|-
|77.
|

| or 

 or 
|
|
|
|-
|78.
|

| or 

 or 
|
|
|
|-
|79.
|

| or 

 or 
|
|
|
|-
|80.
|

| or 

 or 
|
|
|
|-
|81.
|

| or 

 or 
|
|
|
|-
|82.
|

| or 

 or 
|
|
|
|-
|83.
|

| or 

 or 
|
|
|
|-
|84.
|

| or 

 or 
|
|
|
|-
|85.
| or 
 or 
| or 

 or 

 or 

 or 
|
|
|
|-
|86.
|

| or 

 or 
|
|
|
|-
|87.
|

| or 

 or 
|
|
|
|-
|88.
|

| or 

 or 
|
|
|
|-
|89.
|

| or 

 or 
|
|
|
|-
|90.
|

| or 

 or 
|
|
|
|-
|91.
|

| or 

 or 
|
|
|
|-
|92.
|

| or 

 or 
|
|
|
|-
|93.
| or 
 or 
| or 

 or 

 or 

 or 
|
|
|
|-
|94.
|

| or 

 or 
|
|
|
|-
|95.
| or 
 or 
| or 

 or 

 or 

 or 
|
|
|
|-
|96.
|

| or 

 or 
|
|
|
|-
|97.
|

| or 

 or 
|
|
|
|-
|98.
|

| or 

 or 
|
|
|
|-
|99.
|

| or 

 or 
|
|
|
|-
|100.
|

| or 

 or 
|
|
|
|-
|101.
|

| or 

 or 
|
|
|
|-
|102.
|

| or 

 or 
|
|
|
|-
|200.
|

| or 

 or 
|
|
|
|-
|300.
|

| or 
 or 
|
|
|
|-
|400.
|

| or 
 or 
|
|
|
|-
|500.
| or 
 or 
| or 

 or 

 or 

 or 
|
|
|
|-
|600.
|

| or 
 or 
|
|
|
|-
|700.
|

| or 
 or 
|
|
|
|-
|800.
|

| or 

 or 
|
|
|
|-
|900.
|

| or 

 or 
|
|
|
|-
|1000.
|

| or 

 or 
|
|
|
|-
|1001.
|

| or 

 or 
|
|
|
|-
|1002.
|

| or 

 or 
|
|
|
|-
|1100.
|

or

 or 

 or 
| or 

 or 

or

 or 

 or 

 or 

 or 
|
|
|
|-
|1500.
|

or

| or 

 or 

or

 or 

 or 
|
|
|
|-
|10,000.
| or 
 or 
| or 

 or 

 or 

 or 
|
|
|
|-
|Hundred thousand
|

| or 

 or 
|
|
|
|-
|Million
| or 
 or 
| or 

 or 

 or 

 or 
|
|
|
|-
|Ten million
| or 
 or 
| or 

 or 

 or 

 or 
|
|
|
|-
|Billion
|

| or 

 or 
|
|
|
|-
|Hundred billion
|

| or 

 or 
|
|
|

Vocabulary
Kashmiri is an Indo-Aryan language and was heavily influenced by Sanskrit, especially early on. After the arrival of Islamic administrative rule in India, Kashmiri acquired many Persian loanwords. In modern times, Kashmiri vocabulary has been imported from Hindustani and Punjabi.

Preservation of old Indo-Aryan vocabulary
Kashmiri retains several features of Old Indo-Aryan that have been lost in other modern Indo-Aryan languages such as Hindi-Urdu, Punjabi and Sindhi. Some vocabulary features that Kashmiri preserves clearly date from the Vedic Sanskrit era and had already been lost even in Classical Sanskrit. This includes the word-form yodvai (meaning if), which is mainly found in Vedic Sanskrit texts. Classical Sanskrit and modern Indo-Aryan use the word yadi instead.

First person pronoun
Both the Indo-Aryan and Iranian branches of the Indo-Iranian family have demonstrated a strong tendency to eliminate the distinctive first person pronoun ("I") used in the nominative (subject) case. The Indo-European root for this is reconstructed as *eǵHom, which is preserved in Sanskrit as aham and in Avestan Persian as azam. This contrasts with the m- form ("me", "my") that is used for the accusative, genitive, dative, ablative cases. Sanskrit and Avestan both used forms such as ma(-m). However, in languages such as Modern Persian, Baluchi, Hindi and Punjabi, the distinct nominative form has been entirely lost and replaced with m- in words such as ma-n and mai. However, Kashmiri belongs to a relatively small set that preserves the distinction. 'I' is ba/bi/bo in various Kashmiri dialects, distinct from the other me terms. 'Mine' is myon in Kashmiri. Other Indo-Aryan languages that preserve this feature include Dogri (aun vs me-), Gujarati (hu-n vs ma-ri), Konkani (hā̃v vs mhazo), and Braj (hau-M vs mai-M). The Iranian Pashto preserves it too (za vs. maa).

Variations
There are very minor differences between the Kashmiri spoken by Hindus and Muslims. For 'fire', a traditional Hindu uses the word   while a Muslim more often uses the Arabic word  .

Sample text

Perso-Arabic script 
Art. 1 of the Universal Declaration of Human Rights:

 

"All human beings are born free and equal in dignity and rights. They are endowed with reason and conscience and should act towards one another in a spirit of brotherhood."

Sharada script 
Verses by Lalleshwari:

"I kept reciting the unique divine word "Om" and kept it safe in my heart through my resolute dedication and love. I was simply ash and by its divine grace got metamorphosed into gold."

One who recites the divine word "Omkār" by devotion is capable to build a bridge between his own and the cosmic consciousness. By staying committed to this sacred word, one doesn't require any other mantra out of thousands others.

See also 

 Kashmir Valley
 Kashmiri Wikipedia
 List of Kashmiri poets
 List of topics on the land and the people of “Jammu and Kashmir”
 Shina language
 States of India by Kashmiri speakers

References

Bibliography

External links 

 
 
 
 
 
 
 
 
 
 
 
 
 Hook, Peter E. 1976. Is Kashmiri an SVO language? Indian Linguistics 37: 133–142.
 
 
 Kashmiri Language Textbook for Class1
 Kashmiri Language Textbook for Class 2
 Kashmiri Language Textbook for Class 3
 Kashmiri Language Textbook for Class 6
 Kashmiri Language Textbook for Class 8
 Kashmiri Language Textbook for Class 10
 Koshur: An Introduction to Spoken Kashmiri
  
  
  
 
 
 
 
 
 
 
"Neab", Kashmiri Language Literary Magazine

"Sangarmal", Kashmiri Language Newspaper

"Soan Meeraas", Kashmiri Language Newspaper
 
 
 

 
 
 
  
 the word koshur(𑆑𑆳𑆯𑆶𑆫𑇀) written on New Testament in Kashmiri, (manuscript)

 
Dardic languages
Languages of Azad Kashmir
Official languages of India
Languages of Jammu and Kashmir
Languages written in Devanagari
Verb-second languages
Kashmir
Languages attested from the 13th century
Languages written in Indic scripts
Sahitya Akademi recognised languages
Indo-Aryan languages